My God is the eighth album by the thrash metal band Flotsam and Jetsam. It was released on May 22, 2001 and was their last release on Metal Blade Records until the 2013 reissue of Ugly Noise.

My God sees Flotsam and Jetsam continuing the return to their thrashy sound on its predecessor Unnatural Selection, and expanding on the lyrical content of their 1990s material, with themes related to politics, religion and social issues.

Track listing 

Hidden track
The final song of the album, "I.A.M.H.," contains a hidden song. The central part of the instrumental track ends at 6:06 and the hidden song starts after 2:00 of silence. After which an Acoustic Version of "Trash" plays for 5:35.

Credits 
 Edward Carlson : guitars
 Eric A.K. : vocals
 Jason Ward : bass guitar
 Craig Nielsen : drums
 Mark Simpson : guitars
Tory Edwards  : violin

References 

2001 albums
Flotsam and Jetsam (band) albums